Marijo Marić (born 12 January 1977) is a Croatian former professional footballer who played as a striker.

He is the brother of Tomislav Marić.

Club career
Marić was born in Heilbronn, West Germany. He started his career at TSF Ditzingen, near Heilbronn, Baden-Württemberg. He was then signed by Stuttgart II, and then had spells at Waldhof Mannheim, SSV Reutlingen and VfL Bochum.

He then moved to Austrian club FC Kärnten and returned to Germany in summer 2004 when Arminia Bielefeld signed him for a two-year deal with a transfer fee of €150,000.

He just made five substitute appearances and then moved to Eintracht Trier in the 2. Bundesliga in January 2005. He then joined SpVgg Unterhaching also in the 2. Bundesliga and after that Regionalliga club VfR Aalen.

On 16 February 2009, he had an unsuccessful trial with Iranian giants Esteghlal F.C. and joined later KSG Gerlingen.

International career
While playing at FC Kärnten in the Austrian Bundesliga, he was called up to the Croatia national football team, for whom he earned eight caps and scored one goal. While six of these were friendly matches, two of them were Euro 2004 qualifying matches. His international goal came in the friendly match against Macedonia on 9 February 2003.

In the national team, he played three matches along with his brother Tomislav, two of them were Marijo replaced Tomislav, one of them were they both at the field at the same time.

He made his international debut in the friendly against Wales on 21 August 2002 and he played his last match against Slovakia, in a friendly match on 29 May 2004.

He also played a B friendly against Romania, on 30 January 2001.

References

External links
 

1977 births
Living people
Sportspeople from Heilbronn
Footballers from Baden-Württemberg
German people of Croatian descent
Association football forwards
Croatian footballers
Croatia international footballers
TSF Ditzingen players
VfB Stuttgart II players
SV Waldhof Mannheim players
SSV Reutlingen 05 players
VfL Bochum players
VfL Bochum II players
FC Kärnten players
Arminia Bielefeld players
SV Eintracht Trier 05 players
VfR Aalen players
SpVgg Unterhaching players
Bundesliga players
2. Bundesliga players
3. Liga players
Austrian Football Bundesliga players
Croatian expatriate footballers
Expatriate footballers in Austria
Croatian expatriate sportspeople in Austria